Bow Barracks Forever (2004) is an Indian film directed by Anjan Dutt about Anglo-Indians and their difficulties in retaining their identity since the end of British India.

Plot
The film is about the disaster of the human spirit. It is not easy to fight back the march of progress. Progress brings with it change, often painful, that breaks continuity and destroys tradition, history, power and passion of communities that have lived and grown together over decades. Anjan Dutt's film captures the real-life story of a tiny, resolute Anglo-Indian community right in the heart of bustling north Kolkata trying desperately to keep alive its hopes, dreams, aspirations and identity, as the world around them changes swiftly and tries to impose that change on them and their lives.

See also
 Bow Barracks – a locality of Kolkata, known for being a small hub of mainly Anglo-Indian population.

References

External links

2004 films
2004 drama films
Indian drama films
2000s Hindi-language films
Films set in Kolkata
Films directed by Anjan Dutt
Hindi-language drama films